Passage of Arms is a 1959 novel by Eric Ambler.

Plot

The novel is about the discovery of a cache of arms, abandoned by Communist insurgents in the Malayan jungle, and the later transfer of the arms via Singapore to Indonesia. It is structured as three connected stories. The outer, framing story is that of Girija Krishnan, the Tamil plantation clerk who finds the arms cache and sells it to raise money so that he can create a local bus service company. Krishnan's story of business ambition leads to the story of an entrepreneurial Chinese trading family who arrange the transferring of the arms from seller to buyer. The central, third story features an American couple, Greg and Dorothy Nilsen, who are tourists of the Far East used to legitimize the transaction, and so find themselves in great danger. The Nilsens are on a cruise holiday when they are asked by Mr Tan to go to Singapore to participate in an arms deal in exchange for a handsome fee.

Context
The title is a double reference to the novel's plot and the expression a "passage of arms".

The Nilsens are an example of the recurrent "innocents abroad" theme that characterizes Ambler's novels.

Reception

New York Times reviewer James M. Cain, also a thriller-writer in his own right, described the book as "... a picture of Southeast Asia, in all its color and the savagery of its current turmoil ... this is tops, and gets down to bedrock."

The book won the 1959 Gold Dagger award (then known as the "Crossed Red Herring Award").

References

External sources

"Passage of Arms" Review in Things Asian. Retrieved 25 Jan 2009.
"Eric Ambler" Bastulli Mystery Library.  Retrieved 25 Jan 2009.

1959 British novels
British spy novels
Novels by Eric Ambler
Heinemann (publisher) books